The Builders and Managers of Freedom and Democracy was an oppositional political party in Benin. It was part of the Star Alliance which contested the 1999 and 2003 parliamentary elections. At the Beninese parliamentary election, 2003, the Star Alliance won 3 out of 83 seats.

Defunct political parties in Benin